James Daniel May (born 16 January 1963) is an English television presenter and journalist. He is best known as a co-presenter of the motoring programme Top Gear alongside Jeremy Clarkson  and Richard Hammond from 2003 until 2015. He also served as a director of the production company W. Chump & Sons, which has since ceased operating. He is a co-presenter of the television series The Grand Tour for Amazon Prime Video, alongside his former Top Gear colleagues, Clarkson and Hammond, as well as Top Gear's former executive producer Andy Wilman.

May has presented other programmes on themes including science and technology, toys, wine culture, and the plight of manliness in modern times. He wrote a weekly column for The Daily Telegraphs motoring section from 2003 to 2011.

Early life

James Daniel May was born in Bristol, the son of aluminium factory manager James May and his wife Kathleen. He was one of four children; he has two sisters and a brother. May attended Caerleon Endowed Junior School in Newport. He spent his teenage years in South Yorkshire where he attended Oakwood Comprehensive School in Rotherham and was a choirboy at Whiston Parish Church.

May studied music at Pendle College, Lancaster University, where he learned to play the flute and piano, and also spent a year studying metalwork at a technical college. After graduating, May briefly worked at a hospital in Chelsea as a records officer and had a short stint in the civil service before taking up journalism and broadcasting in his thirties. He also held a part-time job as a moulder at the foundry his father was employed at and suggested in a 2017 interview with The Times that this formed his interest in mechanics.

Journalism career
During the early 1980s, May worked as a sub-editor for The Engineer and later Autocar magazine, from which he was dismissed for performing a prank. He has since written for several publications, including the regular column England Made Me in Car Magazine, articles for Top Gear magazine, and a weekly column in The Daily Telegraph.

He has written the book May on Motors (2006), which is a collection of his published articles, and co-authored Oz and James's Big Wine Adventure (2006), based on the TV series of the same name. He wrote the afterword to Long Lane with Turnings, published in September 2006, the final book by motoring writer L. J. K. Setright. In the same month, he co-presented a tribute to Raymond Baxter. Notes From The Hard Shoulder and James May's 20th Century, a book to accompany the television series of the same name, were published in 2007.

Dismissal from Autocar

In an interview with Richard Allinson on BBC Radio 2, May confessed that in 1992 he was dismissed from Autocar magazine after putting together an acrostic in one issue. At the end of the year, the magazine's "Road Test Yearbook" supplement was published. Each spread featured four reviews and each review started with a large red letter (known in typography as an initial). May's role was to put the entire supplement together.

To alleviate the tedium, May wrote each review such that the initials on the first four spreads read "ROAD", "TEST", "YEAR" and "BOOK".  Subsequent spreads seemingly had random letters, starting with "SOYO" and "UTHI"; when punctuated these letters spelt out the message: "So you think it's really good, yeah? You should try making the bloody thing up; it's a real pain in the arse."

Television career
His past television credits include presenting Driven on Channel 4 in 1998, narrating an eight-part BBC One series called Road Rage School, and co-hosting the ITV1 coverage of the 2006 London Boat Show. He also wrote and presented a Christmas special called James May's Top Toys (for BBC One).  James May: My Sisters' Top Toys attempted to investigate the gender divide of toy appeal. In series 3, episode 3 of Gordon Ramsay's The F Word, May managed to beat Ramsay in eating bull penis and rotten shark and with his fish pie recipe.

Top Gear

May was briefly a co-presenter of the original Top Gear series in 1999, during an interview in 2020, Jeremy Clarkson claimed that the show's original producers had decided to replace him with May in 1999, though they felt dissatisfied with May as he was soon fired in 2000, shortly before the entire program was cancelled the following year. Clarkson recalls May's firing in 2000 caused him to retreat into alcoholism for a brief period of time. Following the first season of the show's relaunch in 2002, Clarkson managed to convince Andrew Wilman to rehire him to replace Jason Dawe. He first co-presented the revived series of Top Gear in its second series in 2003, where he earned the nickname "Captain Slow" owing to his careful driving style. In an earlier episode he also tested the original version of the Bugatti Veyron against the Pagani Zonda F.

May, along with co-presenter Jeremy Clarkson and an Icelandic support crew, travelled by car to the magnetic North Pole in 2007, using a modified Toyota Hilux. In the words of Clarkson, he was the first person to go there "who didn't want to be there". He also drove a modified Toyota Hilux up the side of the erupting volcano Eyjafjallajökull.

Following the BBC's decision not to renew Jeremy Clarkson's contract with the show on 25 March 2015, May stated in April 2015 that he would not continue to present Top Gear as part of a new line-up of presenters.

Science
May presented Inside Killer Sharks, a documentary for Sky, and James May's 20th Century, investigating inventions. He flew in a Royal Air Force Eurofighter Typhoon at a speed of around 1320 mph (2124 km/h) for his television programme, James May's 20th Century. In late 2008, the BBC broadcast James May's Big Ideas, a three-part series in which May travelled around the globe in search of implementations for concepts widely considered science fiction. He has also presented a series called James May's Man Lab. In 2013, May narrated To Space & Back, a documentary on the influence of developments in space exploration on modern technology produced by Sky-Skan and The Franklin Institute.

James May on the Moon

James May on the Moon (BBC 2, 2009) commemorated 40 years since man first landed on the moon. This was followed by another documentary on BBC Four called James May at the Edge of Space, where May was flown to the stratosphere (70,000 ft) in a US Air Force Lockheed U-2 spy plane. Highlights of the footage from the training for the flight, and the flight itself was used in James May on the Moon, but was shown fully in this programme. This made him one of the highest flying people, along with the pilot, at that time, after the crew of the International Space Station.

James May's Toy Stories

Beginning in October 2009, May presented a 6-part TV series showing favourite toys of the past era and whether they can be applied in the modern-day.  The toys featured were Airfix, Plasticine, Meccano, Scalextric, Lego and Hornby. In each show, May attempts to take each toy to its limits, also fulfilling several of his boyhood dreams in the process. In August 2009, May built a full-sized house out of Lego at Denbies Wine Estate in Surrey. Plans for Legoland to move it to their theme park fell through in September 2009 because costs to deconstruct, move and then rebuild were too high and despite a final Facebook appeal for someone to take it, it was demolished on 22 September, with the plastic bricks planned to be donated to charity.

Also for the series, he recreated the banked track at Brooklands using Scalextric track, and an attempt at the world's longest working model railway along the Tarka Trail between Barnstaple and Bideford in North Devon, although the attempt was foiled due to parts of the track being stolen and vandals placing coins on the track, causing a short circuit.  Later, in 2011, May tried for the record again, proposing a race between German model railroad enthusiasts and their British counterparts.  The two teams would start at opposite ends along double tracked mainline.  This time, the effort succeeded with both teams successfully running three trains the entire route.

In December 2012 aired a special Christmas Episode called Flight Club, where James and his team built a huge toy glider that flew 22 miles (35 km) from Devon to the island of Lundy.

In 2013, May created a life-size, fully functional motorcycle and sidecar made entirely out of the construction toy Meccano. Joined by Oz Clarke, he then completed a full lap of the Isle of Man TT Course, a full  mile-long circuit.

Oz and James

In late 2006, the BBC broadcast Oz and James's Big Wine Adventure, a series in which May, a committed bitter drinker, travelled around France with wine expert Oz Clarke. A second series was broadcast in late 2007, this time with May and Clarke in the Californian wine country, and was followed by a third series in 2009 called Oz and James Drink to Britain.

James May: Our Man in...

In January 2020, May hosted a travel documentary named James May: Our Man in Japan, the 6-episode series was released on Amazon Prime Video and follows May's journey from the north end of Japan to its south. Over the course of three months, May explores and participate in many activities to truly understand the country which has intrigued him for a long time. During the trip through major cities like Tokyo and Kyoto, he is accompanied by a cast of different guides and translators.

A second series, James May: Our Man in Italy, is a travel documentary with May on a journey throughout the regions of Italy from Palermo to the Dolomites on a trip exploring the culture, food, and more.

Internet presence

May created Head Squeeze (now renamed "BBC Earth Lab"; May no longer features as a presenter). The channel is a mix of science, technology, history and current affairs. The first video was published in December 2012. Videos are produced by 360 Production for BBC Worldwide.

May created his own YouTube channel, titled "JM's Unemployment Tube", in 2015 after Top Gear was postponed by the BBC following Jeremy Clarkson's dismissal. Mainly featuring cooking videos filmed from his kitchen, as well as mock builds of Airfix models, the channel has over 230,000 subscribers as of March 2021. His most recent video was posted on this channel on the 20th of February 2021.

In 2016, May launched, with his former Top Gear presenters, a social network for motoring fans called DriveTribe.

In 2019, May moved on to created videos on a Drivetribe spin-off brand Foodtribe (replacing JM's Unemployment Tube) frequently using a small, bedsit-like kitchen setup called "The Bug-out Bunker". The channel has since been rebranded as "What Next?"

May became an Internet meme when one of his Foodtribe videos went viral. In it, May makes two cheese sandwiches, during which, May utters the word "cheese". The quote went viral, and was used in various memes and image macros.

Personal life
May lives in Hammersmith, West London, with art critic Sarah Frater, with whom he has been in a relationship since 2000. In July 2010 May was awarded an honorary doctorate by Lancaster University, where he had previously studied music. He holds a Doctor of Letters degree.

In August 2014, May was one of 200 public figures who were signatories to a letter to The Guardian expressing their hope that Scotland would vote against independence from the United Kingdom in September's referendum on that issue.

In June 2016 he supported Remain in the EU referendum. May has described his political leanings as "liberal".

In 2020 May bought half the ownership of a pub in Swallowcliffe, Wiltshire called The Royal Oak which dates from the early 18th century and is a Grade II listed historic site.

Vehicles 
May has owned many cars including a 2005 Saab 9-5 Aero, Bentley T2, Rolls-Royce Phantom, Triumph 2000, Rover P6, Alfa Romeo 164, 1971 Rolls-Royce Corniche, Triumph Vitesse, Jaguar XJS, 1992 Range Rover Classic Vogue, Fiat Panda, Datsun 120Y, Vauxhall Cavalier Mk1, a Ferrari 308 GTB, a 2015 Toyota Mirai, Ferrari F430, Ferrari 458 Italia, 1984 Porsche 911, 2005 Porsche Boxster S (which he claims is the first car he has ever purchased new).

May currently owns a 2010 Porsche 911 Carrera S facelift, a 2016 BMW i3, a 2018 Alpine A110, a 2019 Tesla Model S 100D, a 2021 Toyota Mirai, a 2015 Ferrari 458 Speciale which he ordered following his exit from Top Gear and the VW Beach Buggy used in The Grand Tour Special "The Beach Buggy Boys". He often uses a Brompton folding bicycle for commuting. He passed his driving test on his second attempt and justified this by saying "All the best people pass the second time".

May obtained a light aircraft pilot's licence in October 2006, having trained at White Waltham Airfield. He has owned a Luscombe 8A Silvaire, a Cessna A185E Skywagon, and an American Champion 8KCAB Super Decathlon with registration G-OCOK, which serves as a reference to a common phrase attributed to him.

Filmography

Television

DVD

Video games

Television advertisements

Bibliography

 May on Motors: On the Road with James May. Virgin Books. 2006. Reprinted 2007. 
 Oz and James's Big Wine Adventure. BBC Books. 2006. 
 Notes from the Hard Shoulder. Virgin Books. 2007. 
 James May's 20th Century. Hodder & Stoughton. 2007 (H/B). Reprinted 2007 (P/B). 
 James May's Magnificent Machines. Hodder & Stoughton. 2008. 
 Oz and James Drink to Britain. Pavilion (Anova). 2009. 
 James May's Car Fever. Hodder & Stoughton. 2009 (H/B). Reprinted 2010 (P/B). 
 James May's Toy Stories. Conway (Anova). 2009. 
 James May's Toy Stories: Lego House. Conway (Anova). 2010. 
 James May's Toy Stories: Airfix Handbook. Conway (Anova). 2010. 
 James May's Toy Stories: Scalextric Handbook. Conway (Anova). 2010. 
 How to Land an A330 Airbus. Hodder & Stoughton. 2010 (H/B). Reprinted 2011 (P/B). 
 James May's Man Lab: The Book of Usefulness. Hodder & Stoughton. 2011 (H/B). Reprinted 2012 (P/B) 
 James May: On Board. Hodder & Stoughton. 2012. 
 James May: The Reassembler. Hodder & Stoughton. 2017. 
 James May: Oh Cook!. Pavilion. 2020.

Britcar 24 Hour results

References

External links
 

 
1963 births
Living people
English television presenters
Television personalities from Bristol
Alumni of Lancaster University
Alumni of Pendle College, Lancaster
British motoring journalists
BBC people
English male journalists
English male non-fiction writers
People from Hammersmith and Fulham
The Daily Telegraph people
People from Hammersmith
Top Gear people
Britcar 24-hour drivers